The Marburger Schloss (or Marburg castle), also known as Landgrafenschloss Marburg, is a castle in Marburg, Hesse, Germany, located on top of Schlossberg (287 m NAP). Built in the 11th century as a fort, it became the first residence of Landgraviate of Hesse (HRE). The Marburg Colloquy was held here in 1529.

Today the building is used as a museum (Marburger Universitätsmuseum für Kulturgeschichte, Wilhelmsbau, since 1981) and as an event site.

Location 
The castle is located West of Marburg, Hesse, Germany, on top of Schlossberg ("Castle Hill").

History of the building 

In 1945, the Marburg Files were compiled at Marburg Castle.

See also 
 List of castles in Hesse

External links 

 Landgrafenschloss Marburg, Panoramic tour 
 Marburger Schloss, Three-dimensional model Google SketchUp

Literature 
 Elmar Brohl, Waltraud Brohl: Geschützturm – Barbakane – Rondell – Ravelin. In: Burgenforschung in Hessen. Begleitband zur Ausstellung im Marburger Landgrafenschloß vom 1. November 1996 – 2. Februar 1997. Kleine Schriften aus dem Vorgeschichtlichen Seminar Marburg. Bd. 46. Marburg 1996, S. 183–201, 
 Elmar Brohl: Sicherungs- und Wiederherstellungsmaßnahmen an der Festung Marburg. In: Denkmalpflege und Kulturgeschichte. Wiesbaden 1999, 2, S. 2–9, 
 Dieter Großmann: Das Schloß zu Marburg an der Lahn. Mit Ergänzungen von G. Ulrich Großmann. DKV-Kunstführer Nr. 366/9, 4., veränderte Auflage, Deutscher Kunstverlag, München, Berlin 1999, (keine ISBN).
 G. Ulrich Grossmann: Schloss Marburg. Burgen, Schlösser und Wehrbauten in Mitteleuropa. Bd. 3. Regensburg 1999,

References 

Schloss
Castles in Hesse
Museums in Marburg
Buildings and structures completed in the 11th century